"A Stop at Willoughby" is episode 30 of the American television anthology series The Twilight Zone. Rod Serling cited this as his favorite story from the first season of the series.

Opening narration

Plot
Gart Williams is a contemporary New York City advertising executive who has grown exasperated with his career. His overbearing boss, Oliver Misrell, angered by the loss of a major account, lectures him about giving the "push-push-push" until Gart insults him. Unable to sleep properly at home, he drifts off for a short nap on the train during his daily commute through the November snow.

He wakes to find the train stopped and that he is now in a 19th-century railway car, deserted except for himself. The sun is bright outside, and as he looks out the window, he discovers that the train is in a town called Willoughby. He eventually learns that  it is July 1888. He learns that this is a "peaceful, restful, where a man can slow down to a walk and live his life full measure." Being jerked awake into the real world, he asks the railroad conductor if he has ever heard of Willoughby, but the conductor replies, "Not on this run...no Willoughby on the line."

That night, he has an argument with his shrewish wife Jane. Selfish, cold, and uncaring, she makes him see that he is only a money-machine to her. He tells her about his dream and about Willoughby, only to have her ridicule him as being "born too late", declaring it her "miserable tragic error" to have married a man "whose big dream in life is to be Huckleberry Finn."

The next week, Williams again dozes off on the train and returns to Willoughby where everything is the same as before. As he is about to get off the train carrying his briefcase, the train begins to roll, returning him to the present. Williams promises himself to get off at Willoughby next time.

Experiencing a breakdown at work, he calls his wife, who abandons him in his time of need. On his way home, once again he falls asleep to find himself in Willoughby. This time, as the conductor warmly beckons him to the door, Williams intentionally leaves his briefcase on the train. Getting off the train, he is greeted by name by various inhabitants who welcome him while he tells them he's glad to be there and plans to stay and join their idyllic life.

The swinging pendulum of the station clock fades into the swinging lantern of a railroad engineer, standing over Williams' body. The 1960 conductor explains to the engineer that Williams "shouted something about Willoughby", before jumping off the train and being killed instantly. Williams' body is loaded into a hearse. The back door of the hearse closes to reveal the name of the funeral home: Willoughby & Son.

Closing narration

Production notes
The name "Willoughby" presumably comes from the Midwestern town of Willoughby, Ohio, now a suburb of Cleveland. There are, however, other places with that name in other parts of the United States, including a  Willoughby Creek near Great Valley, New York (however, it is located in the southwest part of the state, nowhere near Connecticut or New York City). Another possible inspiration is Willoughby Avenue, a street only a few miles from the Sony Pictures Studios (formerly MGM) where nearly all Twilight Zone episodes were shot.

The "Stamford" and "Westport/Saugatuck" stops called out by the conductor in the episode do exist—Metro-North Railroad (at the time New Haven Railroad) stops in Fairfield County, Connecticut, include Stamford (the station is now the Stamford Transportation Center), and Westport (the station was once known as Westport & Saugatuck), where series creator Rod Serling once lived.

Williams' home phone number, CApital 7-9899, includes what was once a legitimate central office name for Westport.

"Beautiful Dreamer", a song first published in 1864 and still popular in the 1880s and beyond, can be heard being played by a band. "Oh! Susanna", published in 1848 and among the most popular American songs ever written, is also heard.

In popular culture
Willoughby, Ohio, calls its annual neighborhood festival "Last Stop: Willoughby" in honor of the episode.

The 2000 TV movie For All Time starring Mark Harmon was based on this episode.

In North Conway, New Hampshire, a memorial brick is inscribed “Next Stop Willoughby!"

One of the last episodes of Thirtysomething clearly pays homage to this episode. It has the same title, and in it Michael experiences a crisis similar to that of Williams, though it does not end tragically.

In the Rugrats episode "Family Reunion," the Pickles family takes a train to the town of Willoughby, with the conductor saying, "Next stop Willoughby!"

In the TV series Stargate Atlantis episode, "The Real World", Dr. Elizabeth Weir awakens in the Acute Care Unit of Willoughby State Hospital, a psychiatric hospital. She is told her memories of the last two years off-world was a fantasy and that she had imagined the Stargate project.

Matthew Weiner, creator of the TV series Mad Men, acknowledged the influence of The Twilight Zone on his work, and how Don Draper's life had many superficial similarities to the main character of this episode. Weiner said they also paid homage to the episode in The Sopranos, when Tony Soprano leaves behind his life in his briefcase.

In the TV series The Marvelous Mrs. Maisel (Season 4, episode 2), Abe Weissman (Tony Shalhoub) describes the Willoughby episode to his wife and daughter as they tour Midge’s apartment.

See also
 List of The Twilight Zone (1959 TV series) episodes

References

Further reading
Zicree, Marc Scott: The Twilight Zone Companion.  Sillman-James Press, 1982 (second edition)
DeVoe, Bill. (2008). Trivia from The Twilight Zone. Albany, GA: Bear Manor Media. 
Grams, Martin. (2008). The Twilight Zone: Unlocking the Door to a Television Classic. Churchville, MD: OTR Publishing.

External links
 

The Twilight Zone (1959 TV series season 1) episodes
1960 American television episodes
Fiction about rail transport
Television episodes about time travel
Television episodes written by Rod Serling
Fiction set in 1888
Television episodes set in New York City